Giovanni "Gianni" Battaglia (born 1893 in Luino) was an Italian racing driver. He drove 12 races between 1931 and 1938, all in an Alfa Romeo, including five times the Mille Miglia.

Complete results

References
 racingsportscars.com
 
 teamdan.com
 conceptcarz.com

1893 births
Sportspeople from the Province of Varese
Italian racing drivers
Mille Miglia drivers
Year of death missing
Place of death missing